Andrew Zerzan (born 27 May 1981) is a former World Bank official and working group secretary for the United Nations Counter Terrorism Implementation Task Force. He is Director of Education at the British Council. Andrew is a frequent speaker on economic development and financial crimes issues and a source in anti-money laundering literature. In 2014 he was commended for his work building a worldwide risk management programme at the City of London's Risk Management Awards.

Early life and education
Zerzan was born in the United States. He graduated from the University of Toronto with a double major in politics and economics and subsequently studied financial & commercial regulation at the London School of Economics.

Research and professional life 
Zerzan has worked on initiatives at the United Nations, the World Bank and Bill & Melinda Gates Foundation to transform how the poor move financial assets. He and his colleagues developed the first risk assessment tools to help firms and regulators calibrate responses to the actual risks faced. For this work he was awarded Junior Professional of the Year by the World Bank.

At the British Council, Zerzan helped to form a collaboration between the United Kingdom and China. The aim of this partnership is to connect students in industries such as healthcare, food safety, renewable energy and manufacturing. For this reason the British Council and The Ministry of Education have issued funding to nearly 30 universities including Peking University, Dalian University of Technology, the University of Leeds and King's College London. The United Kingdom is becoming a preferred destination for students from China and according to statistics from Universities and Colleges Admissions Service "the number of university applicants from China has increased by 30 percent during the current academic year".

Zerzan has since been widely involved in public discussions on the impact of technology on global development, particularly in the third world. He has given speeches covering mobile banking and financial crimes in developing countries. He has been a Guest Lecturer at the London School of Economics since 2012. In 2006, Zerzan was noted for contributing to an information technologies report from the non-profit think tank RiOS Institute.

Zerzan has conducted research on the money laundering risks of mobile phone financial services, the risks of new technologies for payments and counter-terrorism.

Zerzan has served on the board of the charity The International Debate Education Association (IDEA), both in London and overseas and he has also done volunteer work for the non-profit organization West London Zone. He was formerly Director of Regulatory Projects for Mobile Money for the Unbanked, a Bill and Melinda Gates Foundation sponsored initiative to extend financial services to those living under $2 day.

In April 2022, Zerzan highlighted the barriers that prevent children from accessing free public education in Kenya. He said that “persistent historical barriers, such as poverty and distance to school,” prevent many children from accessing the teaching and education they deserve, an issue that has stumped education policymakers for years.

He also said it is important to reflect on what education policymakers and funders can do to educate the tens of thousands of children who are not in school.

In March 2022, Zerzan talked to The Mail & Guardian about the research by the British Council that revealed that 54% of nearly 3,000 school leaders and teachers in Zimbabwe, Uganda, Nigeria, Kenya, and Ghana are interested in skills and development regarding gender-inclusive practices. 

Zerzan stated that there is a shift from a gender-blind approach to education toward the individual needs of students, and one of the largest groups is girls.

He also pointed out how girls are often overlooked in classrooms and said cultural pressures resulted in them being told they could not take subjects in the fields of STEM. Zerzan added that this has been addressed by the European Union in South Africa through a programme called Teaching for All.

Zerzan also participated in a panel discussion hosted by CNBC Africa in March 2022 wherein he spoke about intentional education for girls, which involves focusing on their individual needs. He  commented on the gender discrimination that girls, specifically in Africa, face regarding access to education as well as in schools, which often leads to an increase in dropouts. He stated that teaching at the right level is the main intervention that the British Council focuses on. This refers to grouping children by their skills and abilities instead of age.

In December 2021, talking about the market research conducted by the British Council in Africa across six countries (Kenya, Nigeria, Ghana, Ethiopia, Zimbabwe, and Sudan), Zerzan emphasised the importance of understanding the youths’ priorities and aspirations as the first step to ensure their potential is realised. In his article, he highlighted the youth’s aspirations during the pandemic and how collaboration with the UK education sector can support them.

In June 2019, he spoke to China Plus about the UK-China-BRI Countries Education Partnership Initiative, a multilateral education programme designed in partnership between the British Council and China's Ministry of Education. He described it as the beginning of a new chapter and talked about the urgency of the first-of-its-kind initiative. 

He also said that the initiative will help bolster the UK's education reputation by connecting more UK institutions to educational opportunities in China and amongst Belt and Road countries.

In a BBC article, he talked about the importance of 21st-century skills for success in the workplace. He highlighted that the university sector has to re-orientate itself to better serve the needs of the current economy. This means re-thinking what is taught to ensure it is relevant to the next generation and what they’ll face when they enter the workforce. 

In the interview, he also said that Africa is the heart of the world’s future. “With an average age of just 18 years old and with the majority of the world’s youth being African by 2050, the continent matters greatly to everyone.”

Selected list of publications 
 Closing the gender gap in African STEM education, 2022
 Why should scientists communicate clearly with the public?, 2019
 How to make partnering with a Chinese university a success, 2019
 Policing Financial Services: Surveying the Anti-Money Laundering Regulatory Regime, 2011
 New Technologies, New Risks?: Innovation and Countering the Financing of Terrorism, 2010
 Industry Guide: Methodology for Assessing Money Laundering and Terrorist Financing Risks, 2010

References

External links 
 LinkedIn Profile

Living people
World Bank people
American officials of the United Nations
1981 births